Emergency ward normally refers to the emergency department of a hospital.

It may also refer to:
 Emergency Ward (album), an album
 Emergency Ward (film), a film
 Emergency – Ward 10, a British TV series